Mercy Bampo Addo is a Ghanaian diplomat and a member of the New Patriotic Party of Ghana. She is currently Ghana's High Commissioner to Malta, having assumed office in July 2017. Between 2003 and 2009 she was the Deputy Minister and speech writer for the President of Ghana.

Career 
She taught History and Current Affairs at the secondary school level for three and a half years. She worked as a Public Relations practitioner for over two decades first in Ghana’s Cocoa Industry and later, at the Ghana Institute of Management and Public Administration

Education 
Bampo graduated from the University of Ghana, Legon and holds a Master’s Degree in Governance and Leadership, a Graduate Diploma in Journalism and Communication as well as an Honours degree in History.

Ambassadorial appointment
In July 2017, Ghanaian President Nana Akufo-Addo named Mercy Bampo Addo as Ghana's ambassador to Malta. She was among 22 other distinguished Ghanaians who were named to head various diplomatic missions in the world.

Personal life 
Mercy Bampo Addo is married to Prof. Samuel Tetteh Addo, a Professor of Geography of the University of Ghana. They have five children.

References

High Commissioners of Ghana to Malta
Living people
Year of birth missing (living people)
Ghanaian women ambassadors
21st-century Ghanaian women politicians